Krešo Pukšec (2 October 1920 – 26 August 1990) was a Croatian footballer. He played for the Croatia national football team. His career with various clubs from Zagreb lasted two decades.

International career
Pukšec made his international debut in September 1941 and played all 6 games under the flag of the Independent State of Croatia, a World War II-era puppet state of Nazi Germany. His final international was an April 1943 friendly match against Slovakia.

References

"Krešo Pukšec", Nogometni leksikon, Miroslav Krleža Lexicographical Institute. Zagreb, 2004.

External links

1920 births
1990 deaths
Footballers from Zagreb
Association football central defenders
Yugoslav footballers
Croatian footballers
Croatia international footballers
HŠK Concordia players
GNK Dinamo Zagreb players
NK Lokomotiva Zagreb players
Yugoslav First League players